In sewage treatment systems, an anaerobic filter (AF) is a form of anaerobic digester. The digestion tank contains a filter medium where anaerobic microbial populations—organisms that live in the absence of oxygen — can establish themselves. Such filters are commonly employed in the treatment of waste water. These reactors are gaining in popularity versus more established aerobic waste-water treatment systems because they produce a less solid residue than do other types of filter.

See also
Anaerobic digester types
Anaerobic digestion
List of waste-water treatment technologies

References

Anaerobic digester types